A vardo (also wag(g)on, living wagon, van, and caravan) is a traditional horse-drawn wagon used by British Romanichal Travellers as their home. A vardo must have four wheels, with two being used for steering.  The vehicle is typically highly decorated, intricately carved, brightly painted, and even gilded. The Romanichal Traveller tradition of the vardo is seen as a high cultural point of both artistic design and a masterpiece of woodcrafter's art. The heyday of the caravan lasted for roughly 70 years, from the mid-nineteenth century through the first two decades of the twentieth century. Not used for year-round living today, they are shown at the cultural gatherings held throughout the year, the best known of which is Appleby Horse Fair.

Design
A vardo's design includes large wheels set outside the body, whose sides slope outward considerably as they rise toward the eaves. Beyond this characteristic, the six types of caravans differ in shape, size, placement of the wheels relative to the bed, where made, and maker. The roofs of the bow-top and open-lot types are canvas stretched over curved wooden frames; the others are roofed in wood. By the mid-nineteenth century, the designs were almost entirely standardized, and some features are common to all types. The door is almost always in the front.

The small cast-iron cooking stove was invented in America and was available there and in Great Britain from about 1830 on and is a common fixture of the wagons. A cooking stove necessitates a chimney to vent smoke. A caravan's chimney is always on its left side as viewed from its front doorway; as the caravan travels along the left side of the road, the chimney is in less danger from low-hanging tree limbs in that position. The stove rests in a wooden fireplace.

The wagon's interior is typically outfitted with built-in seats, cabinets, a wardrobe, bunks in the rear of the caravan, a chest of drawers, and a glass-fronted china cabinet. There are windows on the left side and rear. Some types have clerestories which let in light and air. A bracket for an oil lamp is mounted over the chest of drawers opposite the fireplace; the chest's top functions as a table.  Wagons' exteriors can range from fairly plain to intricately carved, painted in bright colours, and sheathed in places with gold leaf.

History

The Romanichal began to live in vardos around 1850. Prior to that, they travelled in tilted carts or afoot and slept either under or in these carts or in small tents. Originally Romanichals would travel on foot, or with light, horse-drawn carts, typical of other Romani groups or would build "bender" tents; so called because they were made from supple branches which they bent inwards to support a waterproof covering. The heyday of the Romani caravan was the latter part of the 19th century.

Initially using castoff horses and even mules to draw their chimneyed living wagons, the Romanichal gradually created a breed of horse known variously as the Gypsy Cob (NZ, UK), Gypsy Horse (AU, US, UK), Coloured Cob (Ireland, UK, parts of continental Europe), Gypsy Vanner (CAN, US), Tinker Horse (parts of continental Europe) and Irish Cob (Ireland) to do so.

Wagons were first used as a form of living accommodation (as opposed to carrying people or goods) in France in 1810 by non-Romani circus troupes. Large transport wagons combined storage space and living space into one vehicle, and were pulled by teams of horses. By the 19th century wagons became smaller, reducing the number of horses required, and around the mid-to-late-19th century (1840–1870), Romanichals in Britain started using wagons that incorporated living spaces on the inside, and added their own characteristic style of decoration. In The Old Curiosity Shop (ch. xxvii), Charles Dickens described Mrs. Jarley's well-appointed van:

'One half of it...was carpeted, and so partitioned off at the further end as to accommodate a sleeping-place, constructed after the fashion of a berth on board ship, which was shaded, like the windows, with fair white curtains... The other half served for a kitchen, and was fitted up with a stove whose small chimney passed through the roof. It also held a closet or larder, several chests, a great pitcher of water, and a few cooking-utensils and articles of crockery. These latter necessaries hung upon the walls, which in that portion of the establishment devoted to the lady of the caravan, were ornamented with such gayer and lighter decorations as a triangle and a couple of well-thumbed tambourines.'

These smaller wagons were called "vardo" in the Romani language (originating from the Ossetic word vurdon) for cart. The Romani vardo evolved into some of the most advanced forms of travelling wagon, and are prized for their practicality as well as aesthetic design and beauty. There is no more iconic or recognizable Romani symbol than a highly decorated Romanichal vardo, and the time of its use is often affectionately called "the wagon time" by Romanichal travellers. The vardos were typically commissioned by families or by a newlywed couple from specialist coach builders. Building the vardo took between six months to a year; a variety of woods including oak, ash, elm, cedar, and pine were utilized in its construction. Prized by the Romani, and later by non-Romani, including other traveller groups, for their practicality as well as aesthetic beauty, vardos can be categorized into six main styles; these being the Brush wagon, Reading, Ledge, Bow Top, Open lot, and Burton. The general design evolved over time and were named after the home's owners, for their traditional style (Ledge), for the town of its construction (Reading), or for the name of the builder.

Burton wagon
Popular with Romanis, as well as Showmen families and circus people, the Burton wagon is the oldest example of a wagon used as home in Britain. Originally undecorated, the Burton wagon evolved into an elaborate Romani vardo, but due to its smaller wheels it was not suited for off-road use.

Brush wagon
The Brush or fen wagon as it was also known, consists of a standard Romani vardo, with straight sides and the wheels located outside the body. The Brush was similar in construction to the Reading vardo, but unlike other styles, the brush wagon had two distinct features: a half-door with glazed shutters, located at the back of the vardo, with a set of steps, both set around the opposite way from other wagons  and lacked the mollycroft (skylight) on the roof. The exterior is equipped with racks and cases fitted on the outside frame and chase of the wagon allowing the owner to carry trade items like brushes, brooms, wicker chairs, and baskets. Additionally, three light iron rails ran around the entire roof, used for stowing bulkier goods, and sometimes trade-name boards. The wagons were elaborately and colourfully painted.

Reading wagon

The Reading or kite wagon is so named due to its straight sides that slope outwards towards the eaves, high arched wheels, and relative light weight; there is no other vardo that epitomises the golden age of Romani horse travel. It dates from 1870 and is synonymous with the original builder Dunton and Sons of Reading from where the vardo takes its name. The wagon was highly prized by the Romanies for its aesthetic design, beauty and practicality to cross fords, pull off-road and over rough ground, something smaller-wheeled wagons like the Burton were unable to do. The Reading wagon is 10 feet long, with a porch on the front and back. The rear wheels were 18 inches larger than the ones on the front. At the start of the 20th century the design incorporated raised skylights.

On either side of the bed space, quarter-inch thick bevelled mirrors were common, and were lavishly decorated. Cupboards and locker seats were built in to prevent movement whilst travelling. Side and back windows were decorated and shuttered, and the body of the vardo itself would have originally been made from beaded tongue-and-groove matchboard, painted red picked out in yellow and green. As with other vardo, the extent of the elaborate decoration reflected the wealth of the family, boasting carved lion heads and gargoyles; these would have been painted gold or extensively decorated with gold leaf. Today, surviving Reading wagons are prized exhibits in museums or private collections. A fine one is in the University of Reading's Museum of English Rural Life.

Ledge wagon

The characteristic design of the ledge or cottage shaped wagon incorporated a more robust frame and living area that extended over the large rear wheels of the wagon. Brass brackets supported the frame of the wagon and solid arched roof usually 12 feet high, extended over the length of the wagon to form porches at either end and panelled with tongue in groove boards. The porch roof was further supported by iron brackets, and the walls were highly decorated with ornate scrollwork and carvings across the length of the wagon.

Bow top
Based on the design of the Ledge wagon, the Bow Top is significantly lighter, and less likely to turn over in a strong wind. The design incorporated a lightweight canvas top, supported by a wooden frame: a design reminiscent of the older “bender tents” used by the Romanichal. Both back and front walls of the wagon were decorated in scrollwork and tongue and groove and the wagon was painted green to be less noticeable in woodland. The inside of the Bow Top also contained the same high scrollwork or Chenille fabric, with a stove, table and double bed.

The bow-top is commonly thought of as being covered in teal-coloured canvas. This is said to now be a tradition which began before World War II when only cotton duck was available.

Open lot
Almost identical in size and construction of the Bow Top wagon, the Open lot or Yorkshire Bow featured the same design but with a curtain instead of the door characteristic of other wagons.  The wagon's entrance was covered by a curtain for privacy.

Decoration and painting

Vardos were elaborately decorated, hand carved and ornately painted with traditional Romani symbols.  Examples of famous Wagon Artists responsible for the early development of vardo art are Jim Berry, John Pockett, Tom Stevens, Tommy Gaskin, John Pickett, modern contemporary decorators continuing to shape this colourful tradition included artists such as Yorkie Greenwood and Lol Thompson.

Much of the wealth of the vardo was on display in the carvings, which incorporated aspects of the Romani lifestyle such as horses and dogs, as well as stock decorative designs of birds, lions, griffins, flowers, vines and elaborate scrollwork. Carved details were often accented with gold, either painted or, in the most expensive wagons, the use of between 4-15 books of gold leaf applied as decoration. Many individual makers were identified by their particular designs.

Funeral rites
The Romanichal funeral rite during the wagon time of the 19th and 20th century included burning the wagon and belongings after the owner's death. The custom was that nothing whatsoever would have been sold, though some of the deceased's possessions, jewellery, china or money would be left to the family. The rest, including the wagon, was destroyed.

Modern traditional use
The Romani travellers in the 1920s proudly clung to their decorative vardos, although the economics of their way of life was in upheaval due to the contraction in the horse-trading industry and the changes from their traditional crafts. In the present day, Romanichals are more likely to live in caravans.  It was estimated that by 1940 only about 1% of Romani travellers still lived in the traditional horse-drawn vardo.

Today's Romanichal still attend horse fairs, the best known of which is Appleby Horse Fair. Some attendees of the fairs travel there in the traditional manner via horse-drawn vardos. American photographer John S. Hockensmith documented such a journey in 2004, travelling with and photographing the Harker family's 60-mile journey to Appleby in bow top living waggons.

Other uses
The British writer Roald Dahl acquired a traditional vardo in the 1960s which was used as a playhouse for his children; later he used the vardo as a writing room, in which he wrote Danny, the Champion of the World.

John Lennon's Rolls-Royce Phantom V was painted in the style of a Romani gypsy wagon by artist Steve Weaver of private coach maker J.P. Fallon Ltd.

See also

 Gordon Boswell Romany Museum
 Mobile home
 Recreational vehicle
 Shepherd's cart
 Wagon
 Worcestershire County Museum at Hartlebury Castle

References

Sources

External links

 A video sample of a Dunton Reading wagon c.1914. pt1
 A video sample of the original interior of a Dunton Reading wagon c.1914. pt3
 A video of Nick Dowe a traditional vardo painter and wagon restorer.
 How to Build a Modern Gypsy Wagon
 Gypsy wagons at the Worcestershire County Museum

Animal-powered vehicles
Trailers
Romani society
Wagons
Romanichal
Romani culture